Saint-Sulpice-d'Excideuil (literally Saint-Sulpice of Excideuil; Limousin: Sent Soplesí d'Eissiduelh, or Sent Soplesís d'Eissiduelh) is a commune in the Dordogne department in Aquitaine in southwestern France. It is located about 40 km north east of Perigueux.

Population

See also
Communes of the Dordogne department

References

Arrondissement of Nontron
Communes of Dordogne